Acacia spectabilis, commonly known as Mudgee wattle, is an erect or spreading shrub, endemic to Australia. Alternative common names include  glory wattle, Pilliga wattle and golden wattle

It grows to between 1.5 and 4 metres high and has pinnate leaves. The bright-yellow globular flowerheads appear in axillary racemes, mostly between July and November in its native range. These are followed by thin leathery pods which are 4–17 cm long and 10–19 mm wide.

The species occurs naturally in dry sclerophyll forest and heath in New South Wales and Queensland and is commonly cultivated.

References

spectabilis
Flora of New South Wales
Flora of Queensland
Fabales of Australia